Joanna Murray-Smith (born 17 April 1962) is a Melbourne-based Australian playwright, screenwriter, novelist, librettist and newspaper columnist.

Life and career
Murray-Smith was born in Mount Eliza, Victoria; her father was the literary editor and academic Stephen Murray-Smith (1922–1988). Her uncle was the actor John Bluthal. She attended Toorak College and graduated with a BA (Hons) from the
University of Melbourne. On a Rotary International Scholarship in 1995, Murray-Smith attended the writing program at Columbia University, New York. In 2003, she took a sabbatical in Italy. She is married to Raymond Gill and has two sons and one daughter.

In 2000 she was awarded a Commonwealth Medal for Services to Playwriting and in 2012 she was made a Vice-Chancellor’s Fellow at the University of Melbourne.

Notable productions
Many of Murray-Smith's plays have been performed around the world. Honour has been produced in more than three dozen countries, including productions on Broadway and at the Royal National Theatre in London.

Honour was created in 1995 when Murray-Smith was studying in the writing program at Columbia University in New York. There, the play's first public appearance was in a reading with Meryl Streep, Sam Waterston and Kyra Sedgwick. The play was then performed at the Belasco Theatre on Broadway in 1998 with Jane Alexander, Robert Foxworth, Laura Linney and Enid Graham; it earned Tony Award nominations for Alexander and Graham. It was performed at London's Royal National Theatre with Eileen Atkins who won best actress in the Laurence Olivier Awards for the role. Its West End performance took place at Wyndham's Theatre in 2006 with Diana Rigg, Martin Jarvis and Natascha McElhone. The play was remounted in London in 2018 at the Park Theatre starring Henry Goodman and Imogen Stubbs in the lead roles.

Ridge's Lovers was performed in New York under the direction of Brian Leahy Doyle. Honour, Nightfall, Rapture, Ninety, Fury and Day One, a Hotel, Evening have all had staged readings or productions at the annual New York Stage and Film Festival at Vassar College.

Scenes from a Marriage was performed in January 2008 at the Belgrade Theatre, Coventry, directed by Trevor Nunn, with Iain Glen and Imogen Stubbs. Nunn recast the production for its West End season at the St James Theatre in 2013; Olivia Williams and Mark Bazeley played the warring couple. The adaptation was produced in Australia at Queensland Theatre in 2017 starring Marta Dusseldorp and her husband Ben Winspear.

The Female of the Species, based on events in the life of Germaine Greer, opened in the West End at the Vaudeville Theatre in July 2008, directed by Roger Michell and starring Eileen Atkins. A Broadway production, originally planned for 2008 with Annette Bening was postponed. It was nominated for Best New Comedy in the 2009 Olivier Awards. In February and March 2010, the play was staged at the Geffen Playhouse in Los Angeles with David Arquette and Bening. Charles Isherwood of The New York Times wrote about this production: "The Female of the Species is not just antifeminist. In its depiction of women as variously pompous, deluded, self-obsessed, hypocritical, sexually obsequious or just plain crazy, it comes closer to being antifemale."

Switzerland was commissioned by the Geffen Theatre in Los Angeles but by arrangement with the Sydney Theatre Company artistic directors Andrew Upton and Cate Blanchett had its world premiere production at the Sydney Theatre Company starring Sarah Peirse as Patricia Highsmith in 2014. A new production of Switzerland was produced at the Geffen Theatre in 2015 directed by Mark Brokaw and starred Laura Linney in the Highsmith role. The play was also produced at the Melbourne Theatre Company, the Queensland Theatre Company, the State Theatre Company of South Australia and Black Swan Theatre, Perth. It has been produced in numerous productions in Germany, Denmark and Switzerland. In 2019 it played an off-Broadway season at 59E59 Theaters in New York City. Its UK premiere was in 2018 at the Theatre Royal, Bath, starring Phyllis Logan as Highsmith. The production moved to the West End in November 2018 at the Ambassadors Theatre.

Murray-Smith's 2010 one-woman play written for Bernadette Robinson, Songs for Nobodies, opened immediately after Switzerland at the same theatre in January 2019 and marked Robinson's West End debut. The show was nominated for an Olivier award. Songs for Nobodies has toured Australian cities starring Robinson three times since its 2010 premiere production. The play's first production featuring another performer in the role was in New Zealand in 2017 and 2018 when Ali Harper performed the play. Its US premiere at Milwaukee Rep in 2018 starred Bethany Thomas who will perform the role at the Northlight Theatre in Chicago in May 2020.

Murray-Smith made her directorial debut when Queensland Theatre produced her 2019 comedy L'Appartement.

Works
The plays and novels of Murray-Smith have been translated and performed widely around the world. According to the Australia Council, Murray-Smith and Daniel Keene account for half of all foreign productions of Australian plays. However, Murray-Smith feels that within Australia, and especially at the Sydney Theatre Company, her work and that of other Australian writers, e.g., David Williamson's, is insufficiently supported.

Plays
Angry Young Penguins, 1987 (Church Theatre, Melbourne) (see also: Ern Malley)
Atlanta, 1990 (Playbox Theatre Company, Melbourne)
Love Child, 1993 (Playbox Theatre Company)
Ridge's Lovers, 1993 (La Mama, Melbourne)
Flame, 1994 (Griffin Theatre Company, Sydney)
Honour, 1995 (Playbox Theatre Company)
Redemption, 1997 (Playbox Theatre Company)
Nightfall, 1999 (Playbox Theatre Company)
Rapture, 2002 (Playbox Theatre Company)
Bombshells, 2001 (Melbourne Theatre Company, written for Caroline O'Connor)
The Female of the Species, 2006 (Melbourne Theatre Company)
Ninety, 2008 (Melbourne Theatre Company)
Scenes from a Marriage, 2008 (based on the 1973 Bergman film) (Belgrade Theatre Coventry)
Rockabye, 2009 (Melbourne Theatre Company)
Songs for Nobodies, 2010 (Melbourne Theatre Company, written for Bernadette Robinson)
The Gift, 2011 (Melbourne Theatre Company)
Day One, a Hotel, Evening, 2011 (Red Stitch Actors Theatre, Melbourne)
True Minds, 2013 (Melbourne Theatre Company)
Fury, 2013 (Sydney Theatre Company)
Hedda Gabler, 2013 (adaptation of Ibsen play, [State Theatre Company of South Australia]
Switzerland, 2014 (Sydney Theatre Company)
Pennsylvania Avenue, 2014 (Melbourne Theatre Company, written for Bernadette Robinson)
 American Song, 2016 (Milwaukee Rep)
Three Little Words, 2017 (Melbourne Theatre Company)
 Fury (Revised), 2018
L'Appartement, 2019 (Queensland Theatre)
 Berlin, 2021 (Melbourne Theatre Company)
 Rio Sombrio, 2022 (National Theatre of Portugal/ Teatro Nacional D. Maria II)

Novels
Truce, 1994 
Judgement Rock, 2002 
Sunnyside, 2005

Other
The Poems of Ern Malley (ed) 1988, 
Georgia, 1988 (film)
Cassidy, 1989 (for ABC Television, after the novel by Morris West)
"Mimi Goes to the Analyst" in Six Pack, 1992 (for SBS TV)
"Greed" in Seven Deadly Sins, 1993 (for ABC Television)
Lyrics to a song cycle about Harold Holt, music by Paul Grabowsky
Janus: episodes "Fit to Plead", "An Unnatural Act", "A Prima Facie Case", 1995 (for ABC Television)
Libretto to the opera Love in the Age of Therapy, 2002 (by Paul Grabowsky for Opera Australia, Melbourne Festival and Sydney Festival)
Libretto to The Divorce, 2015 (by Elena Kats-Chernin, for ABC Television)
Palm Beach, 2019 (film, co-written with director Rachel Ward)

Awards
Australian Film Institute Award nomination in 1989 for the screenplay to Georgia (shared with Ben Lewin, Bob Weis).
Braille Book of the Year for Judgement Rock
Victorian Premier's Literary Award: Southbank Pacific Prize for Drama for Honour in 1996
Victorian Premier's Literary Award: Louis Esson Prize for Drama for Rapture in 2003
Winner 2004 Fringe First Award, Edinburgh Festival Fringe for Bombshells
International Dublin Literary Award nomination in 2004 for Judgement Rock
Winner 2005 London Theatregoers Choice Award for Bombshells
Final list of twelve of the Miles Franklin Award in 2006 for Sunnyside
Co-winner New South Wales Premier's Literary Awards (Play Award) 2012 for The Gift
Inaugural Winner 2016 of Mona Brand Award, awarded by the State Library of New South Wales in recognition of "an outstanding Australian woman writing for the stage or screen".
Lifetime Achievement Award 2019, University of Melbourne Faculty of Arts

References

External links
Plays by Joanna Murray-Smith (incomplete)
Profile at Currency Press
What I Wrote – Joanna Murray-Smith – Teacher's Notes

1962 births
Living people
University of Melbourne alumni
Australian women dramatists and playwrights
Australian screenwriters
20th-century Australian novelists
21st-century Australian novelists
Australian women novelists
Australian television writers
Australian opera librettists
Women opera librettists
Writers from Victoria (Australia)
21st-century Australian women writers
20th-century Australian women writers
Australian women television writers
People from Mount Eliza, Victoria